Force is what, when unopposed,  changes the motion of an object.

For The Force with the definite article, see The Force (disambiguation).

Force or forces may also refer to:

Places
Force, Marche, a municipality in Ascoli Piceno, Italy
Forcé, Mayenne, France; a commune
Force, Pennsylvania, an unincorporated community in  Pennsylvania
Force or foss, a word in the Yorkshire dialect for "waterfall", e.g.:
Hardraw Force
High Force, a waterfall on the River Tees, England

People
 The Force family of American drag racing:
 John Force (born 1949), family patriarch; father of four daughters, three of whom are or have been racers themselves: 
 Ashley Force Hood (born 1982)
 Brittany Force (born 1986)
 Courtney Force (born 1988)

Arts, entertainment, and media

Fictional entities
Force (comics), a character in the Marvel Comics Iron Man titles
Major Force, a fictional character in the DC Comics universe

Films
 Force (film series), a series of Indian Hindi-language action-thriller films
 Force (2011 film), first installment of the series
 Force 2 (2016), second installment of the series
 Force (2014 film), a Bengali-language film

Music
Force, the early name of the Swedish band Europe
Force (A Certain Ratio album), 1986
Force (Superfly album), 2012
"Force" (Superfly song)
"Force" (Alan Walker song), 2015

Other uses in arts, entertainment, and media
Forcing (magic), a magician's technique sometimes called a "force"
Sonic Forces, a video game

Law, policing, and military
Force (law), unlawful violence or lawful compulsion
Forces, the armed forces collectively of a nation's military
 Security forces, the name of the armed forces in some nations
The force, the police force of a particular jurisdiction

Mathematics and science
Brute force method, proof by exhaustion in mathematics
Fundamental force, an interaction between particles that cannot be explained by other interactions

Sports

Teams
Cleveland Force (disambiguation), defunct indoor soccer teams based in Northeast Ohio
Georgia Force, an Arena Football League team 
Ipswich Force, an Australian basketball team 
Kansas City Force, an American women's gridiron football team
San Antonio Force, an Arena Football League team that played during the 1992 season
Western Force, an Australian rugby union team in the Super 14

Other
FORCE (Formula One Race Car Engineering), a design and construction company within the Haas Lola Formula One team
Force play, a situation in baseball where the runner is compelled to advance to the next base

Other uses
Force (cereal), a wheat flake cereal
Coming into force
Force Motors, an Indian automotive company
Force-feeding, the practice of feeding a human or other animal against their will
Fuerza (political party) (English translation: Force), a political party in Guatemala
The Force, a power in the Star Wars franchise

See also
Armed forces (disambiguation)
Brute force (disambiguation)
Elite Force (disambiguation)
Energy (disambiguation)
Force 1 (disambiguation)
Force 10 (disambiguation)
Force B (disambiguation)
Force Commander (disambiguation)
Force field (disambiguation)
Force majeure (disambiguation)
Force of Nature (disambiguation)
Force One (disambiguation)
Force XXI (disambiguation)
Forcing (disambiguation)
Physical force (disambiguation)
Special forces (disambiguation)
Taskforce (disambiguation)
X force (disambiguation)